The construction of mosques in Greece has been documented since the period of the Greek Ottoman Empire. Most of the mosques listed were built in the late 14th to early 20th centuries, when parts of modern Greece were part of the Ottoman Empire. 

Later several Christian churches throughout Greece were also converted into mosques after the Ottoman conquest, like the Hagios Demetrios church in Thessaloniki. Although gradually Hagios Demetrios was converted back into a church after Greek independence and the annexation of other territories.

East Macedonia and Thrace

Central Macedonia

Western Macedonia

Epirus

Thessaly

Euboea

Western Greece and Peloponnese

Aegean Islands

Crete

Attica

See also
 Islam in Greece
 List of former mosques in Greece
 Greek Muslims
 Lists of mosques

References

Ahmed AMEEN, Islamic Architecture in Greece: Mosques. 
Foreword: Mostafa El Feki,  Center for Islamic Civilization studies, Bibliotheca Alexandrina, Alexandria 2017.

External links

 https://www.academia.edu/34744567/Islamic_Architecture_in_Greece_Mosques

 
Greece
Mosques